Pape Amodou "Modou" Sougou (born 18 December 1984) is a Senegalese former professional footballer who played as a right winger.

Club career

Early years and Portugal
Born in the village of Fissel, in the M'bour Department, Sougou started his career with Dakar-based AS Douanes. He moved to Portugal in 2004 at the age of 19, signing a four-year contract with U.D. Leiria. He made his Primeira Liga debut on 29 November, coming on as a late substitute in a 1–0 home win against S.L. Benfica.

Sougou continued to compete in the Portuguese top flight the following six seasons, representing Vitória de Setúbal, Leiria and Académica de Coimbra. In 2009–10, whilst at the service of the latter club, he scored a career-best in the country nine goals in 29 matches, helping it to the 11th position; additionally, in early 2013, he revealed that he came close to signing with FC Porto when André Villas-Boas was the manager, but a potential deal fell through due to injury.

CFR Cluj
In late May 2011, Sougou joined Liga I side CFR Cluj, having previously signed a pre-contract agreement. The move was put on hold because his previous club, Académica, wanted €300,000 in compensation, but the transfer was eventually completed whilst the player stated one of the main reasons to sign was rejoining former manager Jorge Costa.

Sougou finished his first year in Romania as joint-ninth top scorer with ten goals, adding several assists to help his team win the national championship for the third time in five years. In January 2012, chairman Julius Muresan revealed that the player had been given a release clause of €11 million.

On 20 November 2012, Sougou provided two passes for two of teammate Rui Pedro's three goals in a 3–1 away victory over S.C. Braga in the group stage of UEFA Champions League; he himself contributed two successful strikes in two 2–1 wins in the qualifying rounds, at FC Slovan Liberec and FC Basel. Late in that year, he was named by Gazeta Sporturilor as the second best foreign player in the country behind Wesley.

Marseille
On 24 January 2013, Sougou agreed to a three-year deal with Olympique de Marseille for €4.5 million and a €600,000 annual salary. Upon his arrival, manager Élie Baup stated: "We saw that we were missing an accelerator against Montpellier [...]. Sougou has all of these qualities."

Sougou scored his first goal on 30 January 2013, in a 2–1 away defeat of FC Rouen in the round of 32 of the Coupe de France. His first appearance in Ligue 1 took place on 3 February, when he featured 13 minutes of the 0–1 home loss to AS Nancy Lorraine.

Subsequently, Sougou served two consecutive loan spells at fellow league club Thonon Évian FC. He was fairly played during his two-year tenure, scoring seven times in all competitions and helping his team avoid relegation.

After returning to l'OM, Sougou was left out of the pre-season tour by coach Marcelo Bielsa. He left by mutual consent on 4 August 2015.

Sheffield Wednesday
On 5 August 2015, Sougou signed for Championship side Sheffield Wednesday on a two-year contract. He scored on his debut for his new team six days later, in a 4–1 win against Mansfield Town in the League Cup at the Hillsborough Stadium.

On 31 January 2017, Sougou returned to Portugal and its top division when he joined Moreirense F.C. until the end of the season.

Mumbai City
Sougou joined Mumbai City FC of the Indian Super League on 3 September 2018, ahead of the upcoming campaign. He scored a career-best 12 goals in his first year, helping his team to the third position and only trailing FC Goa's Coro in the individual chart.

International career
Sougou made his debut for Senegal on 21 August 2007, playing the first half of a 1–1 friendly draw in Ghana in London. He was selected for the 2008 Africa Cup of Nations tournament, appearing in two games an eventual group-stage exit.

Personal life
Sougou is a practising Muslim, and observed fasting during the Islamic month of Ramadan.

Career statistics

Honours
CFR Cluj
Liga I: 2011–12

References

External links

1984 births
Living people
Senegalese footballers
Association football wingers
AS Douanes (Senegal) players
Primeira Liga players
U.D. Leiria players
Vitória F.C. players
Associação Académica de Coimbra – O.A.F. players
Moreirense F.C. players
Liga I players
CFR Cluj players
Ligue 1 players
Olympique de Marseille players
Thonon Evian Grand Genève F.C. players
English Football League players
Sheffield Wednesday F.C. players
Indian Super League players
Mumbai City FC players
Senegal international footballers
2008 Africa Cup of Nations players
Senegalese expatriate footballers
Expatriate footballers in Portugal
Expatriate footballers in Romania
Expatriate footballers in France
Expatriate footballers in England
Expatriate footballers in India
Senegalese expatriate sportspeople in Portugal
Senegalese expatriate sportspeople in Romania
Senegalese expatriate sportspeople in France
Senegalese expatriate sportspeople in England
Senegalese expatriate sportspeople in India